OK! TV was an early evening magazine programme, broadcast Monday-Friday at 18:25 on Channel 5. It was presented by Jeff Brazier and Jenny Frost who replaced original hosts Kate Walsh and Matt Johnson on 17 August 2011, when the show moved to the Big Brother compound. It was produced by Sky News. The programme was first broadcast on 14 February 2011.

Series 1 (2011)

References

External links
OK! TV Channel 5
OK! TV Facebook
OK! TV Twitter

Lists of British non-fiction television series episodes